Iver Jåks (25 October 1932 – 17 March 2007) was a Norwegian Sami artist, sculptor and illustrator. 

Iver Iversen Jåks was born in Karasjok  in Troms og Finnmark, Norway.
He was awarded a place at the Norwegian National Academy of Craft and Art Industry in Oslo from 1952 to 1955. 
He won a place at the Royal Danish Academy of Fine Arts in Copenhagen from 1958 to 1959.

He often used elements of Sami culture and mythology in his artistic works. He is represented at the National Gallery of Norway, at Nordnorsk Kunstmuseum, and other museums. He was decorated Knight, First Order of the Royal Norwegian Order of St. Olav in 2002. Among his awards are the Arts Council Norway Honorary Award, the Norwegian Sami Association's honorary prize and the Saami Council's honorary prize.

References

1932 births
2007 deaths
Sámi artists
People from Karasjok
20th-century Norwegian painters
Norwegian male painters
21st-century Norwegian painters
Norwegian illustrators
Norwegian Sámi people
20th-century Norwegian sculptors
20th-century Norwegian male artists
21st-century Norwegian male artists